Diplomatic Immunity is a 2002 science fiction novel by American writer Lois McMaster Bujold, part of the Vorkosigan Saga. It was nominated for the Nebula Award for Best Novel in 2003.

Plot summary
Miles and Ekaterin Vorkosigan are enjoying a delayed honeymoon off-world while their first two children are approaching birth in their uterine replicators back on Barrayar. On their way home, Miles receives Emperor Gregor Vorbarra's command to go to Graf Station in Quaddiespace to untangle a diplomatic incident in his capacity as the nearest Imperial Auditor. There, he is unexpectedly reunited with the Betan hermaphrodite Bel Thorne, a trusted former Dendarii Mercenaries subordinate and his good friend.

Quaddies are the result of genetic manipulation centuries before (as described in Bujold's novel Falling Free).  Intended to be used as laborers in zero-G, they have extra arms instead of legs. However, the invention of artificial gravity rendered them useless to the corporation that created them. They stole a spaceship to avoid being liquidated and colonized a remote star system. At Graf Station, the Quaddies occupy a zero-G section, while visitors use a section with artificial gravity. Quaddies tend to be suspicious of other humans based on their history of callous exploitation.

A convoy of Komarran merchant ships are being prevented from leaving the station due to trouble caused by Barrayaran personnel from their military escort. Furthermore, a Barrayaran security officer is missing, possibly murdered or deserted.

While investigating, Miles uncovers a plot by a high-ranking, renegade, sexless Cetagandan to steal a cargo of extreme importance to the Cetagandans and hide its tracks, if necessary, by framing Barrayar. By the time Miles figures out what is going on, he and Bel have become infected by a highly lethal bioweapon. Miles nearly dies and barely averts an interstellar war between Cetaganda and Barrayar.

Literary significance and reception
Jeff Zaleski, in his Publishers Weekly review, praised Bujold's worldbuilding and "witty, character-centered plot"."  Booklist was mixed in their review saying "though Miles remains clever and debonair throughout, too many early series references needlessly obfuscate a breezy, conventional, albeit deep-space, whodunit."  Paul Brink, in his review for School Library Journal called it a "quick read (with) an abundance of plot twists", noting that Bujold "gets the technical details right, but keeps explanations to a minimum".

Notes

External links
Prologue chapter which Bujold wrote, but decided to exclude from the published text.

2002 American novels
2002 science fiction novels
Novels by Lois McMaster Bujold
Space opera novels